Prochloron (from the Greek pro (before) and the Greek chloros (green) ) is a genus of unicellular oxygenic photosynthetic prokaryotes commonly found as an extracellular symbiont on coral reefs, particularly in didemnid ascidians (sea squirts). Part of the phylum cyanobacteria, it was theorized (endosymbiotic theory) that Prochloron is a predecessor of the photosynthetic components, chloroplasts, found in photosynthetic eukaryotic cells.  However this theory is largely refuted by phylogenetic studies which indicate Prochloron is not on the same line of descent that lead to chloroplast-containing algae and land plants.

Prochloron was discovered in 1975 by Ralph A. Lewin of the Scripps Institution of Oceanography. Surprisingly, unlike most cyanobacteria Prochloron do not contain the red or blue pigments called Phycobilin's, seen in many species of cyanobacteria. Repeated unsuccessful attempts to culture Prochloron outside a host make them the only known obligate photosymbionts in the phylum Chordata.

Species  
The only taxonomically valid species is P. didemni.

References 

 
 Waterbury, John, et al. Little Things Matter A Lot. Oceanus Magazine. 2004, 43(2).
 

Synechococcales
Cyanobacteria genera